GIS United (GU / GIS Utd) is a GIS consulting firm that specializes in the analysis of geo-spatial big data. It is headquartered in Mapo Seogyo, Seoul, South Korea.

Service
GIS United provides consulting services in Business Management and Marketing Strategy, Real Estate Property Analysis, Sustainable Growth and Economic Development, Urban Revitalization, Public Policy, Cultural Resources Management, Election and Politic Issues, and Mediaand Journalism.

Publish
 Geo-spatial Big Data Strategy Map for Public Policy, GIS United | The Soup | 2014.06.30

References
 Korea Culture & Tourism Institute, "GIS Analysis for Tourism Innovation Strategies" (2014)
 Dobong-Gu Office, "Developing GIS Policy Map for Design a Policy Project" (2014)
 Korea Institute of Energy Research, "Research of Solar Energy in South Korea using ArcGIS Program, Korea Institute of Energy Research" (2014)
 Davich Optical Chain, "CRM System Developing" (2014)
 Samsung C&T Engineering & Construction Group, "Quarterly Trend of Commercial Retail Reporting" (2014)
 Korea Cadastral Survey Corporation, "Big Data Strategy for LX Project" (2014)
 Urban Management Institute, "Site Selection Research for Testing Laboratory" (2014)
 BC Co., Ltd, "Target Marketing Consulting for Dong-Busan Lotte Mall Based on Big Data Analysis" (2014)
 BC Co., Ltd, "Social Indicator Survey based on Seongbuk-gu City using Big Data Analysis" (2014)
 Dobong-Gu Office, "Design a 2013 Policy Map using GIS" (2013)
 SAMOO Architects & Engineers, "Designing a Samsung Electronics Co., Ltd Workplace Status of the White Paper" (2013)
 E-Yeon FnC, "E-Yeon FnC Franchise Strategy Consulting Based on Big Data Analysis" (2013)
 BC Co., Ltd, "Apple Plaza at Bundang Site Analysis for Space Design" (2013)
 Won Soon Park Election Camp, "2014 Seoul Special City Mayor Election" (2013)

Geographic information systems
Big data
Companies of South Korea
Organizations based in Seoul